Francis Severeyns (born 8 January 1968 in Westmalle), nicknamed Cisse, is a Belgian former professional footballer who played as a striker for Royal Antwerp, Pisa S.C., KV Mechelen, FC Tirol Innsbruck and K.F.C. Germinal Beerschot. He was the Jupiler League top scorer in 1988 with 24 goals. He played seven matches for the Belgium national team. Whilst at Antwerp he helped them to the 1993 European Cup Winners' Cup Final, in which he scored to tie the game at 1–1, although they went on to lose 3–1 to Parma.

He also played for Royal Cappellen in the Third division A.
Currently, he plays for KV Westmalle, in the Belgian Provincial leagues.

Honours 
KV Mechelen
 Amsterdam Tournament: 1989
 Jules Pappaert Cup: 1990
Belgian Cup: 1990–91 (finalists), 1991–92 (finalists)

Antwerp
 UEFA Cup Winners' Cup: runner-up 1992–93

Individual
 Belgian Young Professional Footballer of the Year: 1987–88
 Belgian First Division top scorer: 1987–88 (24 goals)

References

External links
 
 Rcfc.be 
 

1968 births
Living people
Belgian footballers
Belgium international footballers
Belgian Pro League players
Belgian Third Division players
Serie A players
Austrian Football Bundesliga players
Association football forwards
Royal Antwerp F.C. players
K.V. Mechelen players
Beerschot A.C. players
K.V.C. Westerlo players
FC Tirol Innsbruck players
Pisa S.C. players
Royal Cappellen F.C. players
People from Malle
Belgian expatriate footballers
Belgian expatriate sportspeople in Italy
Expatriate footballers in Italy
Belgian expatriate sportspeople in Austria
Expatriate footballers in Austria
Footballers from Antwerp Province